Lagotis is a genus of flowering plants belonging to the family Plantaginaceae.

Its native range is Eastern Europe to Temperate Asia, Subarctic America.

Species:

Lagotis alutacea 
Lagotis angustibracteata 
Lagotis blatteri 
Lagotis brachystachya 
Lagotis brevituba 
Lagotis cashmeriana 
Lagotis chumbica 
Lagotis clarkei 
Lagotis crassifolia 
Lagotis decumbens 
Lagotis glauca 
Lagotis globosa 
Lagotis humilis 
Lagotis ikonnikovii 
Lagotis integra 
Lagotis integrifolia 
Lagotis kongboensis 
Lagotis korolkowii 
Lagotis kunawurensis 
Lagotis macrosiphon 
Lagotis nepalensis 
Lagotis pharica 
Lagotis praecox 
Lagotis ramalana 
Lagotis stolonifera 
Lagotis takedana 
Lagotis uralensis 
Lagotis wardii 
Lagotis yesoensis 
Lagotis yunnanensis

References

Plantaginaceae
Plantaginaceae genera